James Arciero (born August 27, 1974) is an American politician. He is a state legislator serving in the Massachusetts House of Representatives and is a Democrat.

Early life
Arciero was born August 27, 1974 in Concord, Massachusetts and later graduated from Westford Academy. He received the Eagle Scout award in 1993.

Education
He graduated from the University of Massachusetts Dartmouth with a Bachelors of Arts degree in political science in 1997 and from Suffolk University with a Master of Public Administration degree in 2001.

Political career
From 1996 to 1997 he was a member of the University of Massachusetts Board of Trustees. He is a former member of the Westford Democratic Town Committee.

See also
 2019–2020 Massachusetts legislature
 2021–2022 Massachusetts legislature

References

James Arciero. Massachusetts General Court.

1974 births
Living people
University of Massachusetts Dartmouth alumni
Suffolk University alumni
People from Westford, Massachusetts
Democratic Party members of the Massachusetts House of Representatives
21st-century American politicians